Zhenzhu Khan (Inchü Qaghan) (died October 21, 645), personal name Inan, full regal title Inchü Bilge Qaghan or in Chinese Zhenzhupiqie Khan, was a khan of Xueyantuo, under whom Xueyantuo rose from being a vassal of Eastern Tujue to a mighty khanate ruling over northern and central Asia. During his reign, Xueyantuo largely aligned with the Tang dynasty, even though the two states were at odds at times, with the most serious dispute involving Tang's attempt to reestablish Eastern Tujue as a vassal state under the Qilibi Khan Ashina Simo—an attempt that eventually failed due to frequent incursions by Yi'nan's army against Ashina Simo.  Throughout Yi'nan's reign, Xueyantuo remained powerful despite Tang attempts to curb its power, but after Yi'nan's death, a succession dispute between his sons, Bazhuo and Yemang, led to Bazhuo's killing of Yemang and subsequent internal unrest.  Further, Bazhuo attacked Tang, resulting in a major Tang retaliation campaign that, along with a revolt by the Huige, led to Xueyantuo's destruction in 646.

Prior to Tang's capture of Ashina Duobi 
It is not known when Yi'nan was born, but it is known that he was the grandson of the Yiedie Khan Yishibo, who was the first ruler of the Xueyantuo, then a constituent tribe of the Chile confederation, which was then submitting to the rule of Eastern Tujue khans.  It was said that at the time Yi'nan was initially Xueyantuo's ruler under Eastern Tujue's Jiali Khan Ashina Duobi, Yi'nan had 70,000 tents of people under him.

By 627, it was said that because of Ashina Duobi's misrule, several of the stronger members of the Chile, including Xueyantuo, Huige, and Bayegu, rebelled.  Ashina Duobi sent his son Ashina Yugu to attack the Chile rebels with some 400,000 horsemen, but were defeated by an army of only 5,000 horsemen commanded by the Huige chieftain Pusa.  At the same time, Xueyantuo also defeated four Eastern Tujue generals, and Ashina Duobi could not respond adequately.  Ashina Duobi then sent the subordinate Tuli Khan Ashina Shibobi, against the Chile, but the Huige and the Xueyantuo both defeated Ashina Shibobi, causing him to flee. (Ashina Duobi's subsequent anger at and brief detention of Ashina Shibobi eventually led to Ashina Shibobi also rebelling and entering into an alliance with Tang.)

By late 628, the northern vassals of Eastern Tujue had all rebelled, and they submitted to Yi'nan, offering him the title of khan.  Yi'nan initially declined the title, not daring to use it.  As Emperor Taizong of Tang wanted to enter into an alliance with Xueyantuo against Eastern Tujue, he sent the general Qiao Shiwang as an envoy to Yi'nan, recognizing him the Zhenzhupiqie Khan (or Zhenzhu Khan in short), and awarding him with drums and banners.  Yi'nan was very pleased, and he offered tribute to Emperor Taizong.  It was said that by this point, his territory stretched from the Mohe to the east, Western Tujue to the west, and Gobi Desert to the south, and that many tribes, including Huige (回纥), Bayegu (拔也古), Adie (阿跌), Tongluo (同羅), Pugu (僕骨), and Baixi (白霫), all submitted to him.  In fall 629, he sent his brother Tong to offer tribute to Emperor Taizong, and Emperor Taizong, in return, awarded him with a sword and a whip, stating, "Lord, if your subordinates commit crimes, you can use the sword to execute those with major crimes, and whip those with minor crimes."  Yi'nan was pleased, and this brought fear in Ashina Duobi, who requested a marriage with the Tang imperial clan, to no avail.

In 630, a Tang army commanded by the general Li Jing defeated the Eastern Tujue, capturing Ashina Duobi.  Some of the Eastern Tujue people surrendered to Tang; some surrendered to Xueyantuo; and some fled to the west to Western Tujue or the nearby city states.  Xueyantuo was now the predominant power to the north of the Tang empire.

Reign over former Eastern Tujue territory 
As the supreme ruler over former Eastern Tujue territory, Yi'nan tried to maintain peaceful relationship with Tang by formally submitting to Tang, while at the same time strengthening his state.

In 632, Western Tujue's Siyehu Khan Ashina Dieli attacked Xueyantuo, and Xueyantuo forces defeated him, contributing to Ashina Dieli's subsequent downfall.

Another challenge that Yi'nan had to face was an attack from the Eastern Tujue prince Ashina She'er, who had, during the collapse of the Eastern Tujue, fled to Western Tujue and taken over a part of its territory, claiming the title of Dubu Khan.  As Ashina She'er viewed Xueyantuo as the source of Ashina Duobi's downfall, he vowed vengeance against Xueyantuo, and he attacked Xueyantuo in or around 634, with indecisive results.  However, at that time a new Western Tujue khan, the Dielishi Khan Ashina Tong'e, had just taken the throne, and a large portion of Ashina She'er's people, not willing to continue fighting, fled to Ashina Tong'e, allowing Xueyantuo to counterattack and defeat Ashina She'er.  (Ashina She'er eventually fled to Gaochang and then Tang, eventually becoming a major Tang general.)

Meanwhile, Yi'nan was strengthening, and by 638, he was said to have more than 200,000 soldiers under him.  It was also said that he had divided the army to be separately commanded by his sons Bazhuo and Jialibi, with Bazhuo in charge of the south and Jialibi in charge of the north.  Emperor Taizong, believing that Xueyantuo was becoming strong and difficult to subjugate, created both Bazhuo and Jialibi as subordinate khans under their father, awarding them both drums and banners, ostensibly to honor them, but hoping to instead cause dissent between them.

Meanwhile, Qu Wentai, the king of Gaochang, was said to have allied himself with Western Tujue against Tang, and also tried to engage Xueyantuo in their alliance, sending an emissary to Yi'nan to tell him, "You are a khan, and you have enough power to stand up to the emperor.  Why bow to his emissary?"  Yi'nan, in response, informed Emperor Taizong of Qu's instigation and, when Emperor Taizong sent the general Hou Junji to attack Gaochang in 638, offered to send an army to assist Hou.  Emperor Taizong sent the official Tang Jian and the general Zhishi Sili to Xueyantuo, to award Yi'nan with silk for his loyalty and to discuss coordination.  (However, when Hou actually attacked and conquered Gaochang in 639, it appeared to be without actual participation from Xueyantuo.)

In 639, there was a failed plot, led by the Eastern Tujue prince Ashina Jiesheshuai, to assassinate Emperor Taizong.  Emperor Taizong thereafter rethought his policy of settling the Eastern Tujue people inside Tang borders, instituted initially in 630.  He created the Eastern Tujue prince Ashina Simo as Qilibi Khan, ordering him to take the Eastern Tujue people to settle between the Yellow River and the Gobi.  He sent an emissary to Yi'nan, explaining the reasons and ordering Yi'nan to keep peace with the rebuilt Eastern Tujue.  Yi'nan, while displeased with the action, agreed, and by 641, Ashina Simo had settled in near Dingxiang (in modern Hohhot, Inner Mongolia).

However, Yi'nan disliked the situation and, later that year, believing that Emperor Taizong was about to offer sacrifices to heaven and earth at Mount Tai and would take his soldiers with them, he wanted to use this chance to destroy Ashina Simo.  He commissioned his son Dadu, with an army made of soldiers from the Tongluo, Pugu, Huige, Mohe, and Xi, to attack Eastern Tujue with 200,000 men.  Ashina Simo could not resist, and withdrew within the Great Wall, took up position at Shuo Prefecture (roughly modern Shuozhou, Shanxi), and sought emergency aid from Emperor Taizong.  In winter 641, Emperor Taizong sent the generals Zhang Jian, Li Shiji, Li Daliang, Zhang Shigui, and Li Xiyu, to attack Xueyantuo to try to save Ashina Simo.  Around the new year 642, Li Shiji engaged Dadu's army.  Dadu's army was initially able to kill Li Shiji's army's horses with arrows, but Li Shiji's lieutenant Xue Wanche was able to, in turn, concentrate on attacking Xueyantuo army's horses.  Li Shiji was able to thereafter defeat Dadu, forcing him to flee.  (At the same time, Yi'nan had sent an emissary to Emperor Taizong, offering peace with Eastern Tujue, and after Li Shiji defeated Dadu, Emperor Taizong sent the emissary back to Yi'nan with harsh words, but did not make further attacks on Xueyantuo or rebuke Yi'nan any further.)

Later in 642, Yi'nan began an effort to enter into a marriage with a Tang princess to cement the relationship.  He sent his uncle Nishou to Emperor Taizong, offering a tribute of 3,000 horses, 38,000 mink coats, and a mirror made of amber.  Meanwhile, with the Tang general Qibi Heli -- the chief of the Qibi tribe, a constituent tribe of the Chile as well—being detained in Xueyantuo after he, on a visit back to his tribe, was seized by his own subordinates and taken to Xueyantuo (as his subordinates wanted to submit to Xueyantuo rather than Tang), Emperor Taizong, concerned about Qibi Heli's safety (as Qibi Heli had refused to submit to Xueyantuo, cutting off an ear to show his resolve, causing Yi'nan to nearly execute him), agreed to the marriage proposal, sending the official Cui Dunli to negotiate with Yi'nan the terms, under which Emperor Taizong's daughter Princess Xinxing would marry Yi'nan, in exchange for Qibi Heli's release.

In 643, Yi'nan again sent his nephew Tuli to offer tributes of 50,000 horses, 10,000 cattle or camels, and 100,000 goats, to serve as bride price.  Emperor Taizong welcomed Tuli in a grand ceremony, and Tuli held a great banquet in Emperor Taizong's honor, which Emperor Taizong and his officials personally attended.  However, at Qibi's urging, Emperor Taizong was considering renouncing the marriage—initially ordering Yi'nan to personally meet him and Princess Xinxing at Ling Prefecture (roughly modern Yinchuan, Ningxia) to marry her, believing that Yi'nan would refuse and that he would then have a good excuse to break off the marriage.  When Yi'nan agreed to go to Ling Prefecture, Emperor Taizong found another excuse—that the bride price offered had not been all collected (as, in order to gather the livestock making up the bride price, Yi'nan had to collect them from subordinate tribes, and it was taking longer than thought, and the livestock were also dying from having to go through the Gobi) -- to cancel the marriage treaty, despite strong opposition from his official Chu Suiliang, who pointed out that, effectively, he was devaluing his own words.  Emperor Taizong rationalized his decision by arguing that if Yi'nan had married a Tang princess, he would have greater legitimacy over the Chile tribes and would be more difficult to control.

Meanwhile, Yi'nan was continuing to attack Eastern Tujue periodically.  When Emperor Taizong sent emissaries to try to stop him from doing so, Yi'nan responded:

By the end of 644, the Eastern Tujue people, who were not whole-heartedly supportive of Ashina Simo in the first place, collapsed in light of Xueyantuo threat, fleeing back to Tang territory, and were again settled there.  Ashina Simo also went back to Tang and again became a Tang general, ending Tang's attempt to recreate Eastern Tujue as a vassal state.  This caused Emperor Taizong to be displeased, and when Yi'nan subsequently sent an emissary to offer tribute to Emperor Taizong, who was at that time deeply into preparation to attack Goguryeo, Emperor Taizong responded, "Go back and tell your khan: My son and I are now about to attack Goguryeo.  If he thinks that he can take advantage of this, he is welcome to come!"  Yi'nan, fearful of Emperor Taizong's anger, sent another emissary to apologize and offering to assist in the military campaign against Goguryeo, an offer that Emperor Taizong declined.  In 645, after Emperor Taizong had defeated the main Goguryeo forces at Mount Zhubi, near the fortress of Anshi (in modern Anshan, Liaoning), Goguryeo's mangniji (regent) Yeon Gaesomun requested that Yi'nan attack Tang, offering great tributes to him if he did.  Yi'nan, fearful of Tang power, did not do so.  (However, Emperor Taizong was eventually forced to abandon the campaign anyway after being stymied in his siege of Anshi.)

Yi'nan died in fall 645. Despite the friction that had developed in the latter years, Emperor Taizong held a grand mourning ceremony for Yi'nan.  It was said that Yi'nan, with Tang permission, had previously created his oldest son Yemang Tulishi Khan, giving him the eastern parts, to govern over various tribes, and his wife's son Bazhuo the Siyehu Khan, giving him the western parts, to govern over the Xueyantuo people, and that Emperor Taizong had carried out the creation in grand ceremonies.  Yemang was said to be violent and disturbed, and also having a poor relationship with Bazhuo.  After Yi'nan's death, both attended the funeral, and after the funeral, Yemang, fearful that Bazhuo would harm him, departed suddenly first, which led to Bazhuo chasing him down and killing him.  Bazhuo thereafter took the throne with the title of Jialijulixueshaduomi Khan (or Duomi Khan, in short).

Notes and references

Primary sources 
 Tang Huiyao, vol. 96.
 Zizhi Tongjian, vols. 192, 193, 194, 195, 196, 197, 198.

Xueyantuo khans
Tang dynasty people
645 deaths
Year of birth unknown
7th-century rulers in Asia